Zeta Sigma Chi (also known as Z-Chis, pronounced "Zeek eyes") is a multicultural American sorority founded in 1991 at the Northern Illinois University in DeKalb, Illinois. It was the third national multicultural organization founded in the United States.

History 
On March 3, 1991, Zeta Sigma Chi Multicultural Sorority Inc. was established at Northern Illinois University by eight founding members known as the Mommy Chis. The Mommy Chis are Maribel Campa, Zandra Cortes, Sandra de la Roca, Veronica Escobar, Sandra Gomez, Jacqueline Herrera, Laura Murillo, and Julie Sanders.

Zeta Sigma Chi is based upon five principles. The organization's principles are sisterhood, multiculturalism, education, community service, and social justice.

The Oakland University Office for Student Involvement selected its Zeta Sigma Chi chapter as the Fraternity & Sorority Life Organization of the Year for the 2019–2020 academic year.

Symbols 
Zeta Sigma Chi's colors are peach and black. Its flower is the peach rose and its symbol is the unicorn. Its motto is "Keeping the Dream Alive."

Activities 
The sorority's philanthropies are the Ronald McDonald House Charities and the National Association for Multicultural Education (NAME). The Eastern Michigan University chapter hosts an annual SexapalooZa to encourage positive discussion and education about healthy and safe sex. The University of Michigan chapter held a workshop to discuss homophobia in the Greek system.

Chapters

References 

Student organizations established in 1991
Student societies in the United States
1991 establishments in Illinois